Nadja Abd el Farrag (born 5 March 1965), also known under the stage name Naddel, is a German television presenter and singer.

Early life

Nadja Abd el Farrag was born in Hamburg to a Sudanese father, Ibrahim, and a German mother, Uta. She described her father as very strict and was estranged from him for the last fifteen years before his death. She has a younger sister. She left school a year before the Abitur. She later did an apprenticeship as a chemist's assistant and worked in a shop.

Career

In 1989, Abd el Farrag met Dieter Bohlen in Hamburg and became a background singer for his project Blue System. During that time, she briefly had a part-time job in a hospice. Abd el Farrag and Bohlen were in a relationship from 1989 to 1996 and from 1997 to 2001. In 1999, she did two photoshoots for the magazine Playboy. From 1999 to 2000, she presented the RTL II erotic show Peep!.

In 2002, Abd el Farrag published a cook book, which was followed by her autobiography Ungelogen in 2003. Ungelogen details her youth and her relationship with Bohlen, and also contains controversial statements about her former manager Gerd Graf Bernadotte, who sued her to have some passages removed. In 2004, she took part in the second season of Ich bin ein Star – Holt mich hier raus!, the German version of I'm a Celebrity...Get Me Out of Here!. In 2005, she was a guest on Big Brother Germany for a week. In 2006, she released the single "Blinder Passagier" with Austrian schlager singer Kurt Elsasser, which was followed by their collaborative album Weiße Pferde in 2007. That same year, they took part in the preselection for the Grand Prix der Volksmusik with the song "Heimat". From 2007 to 2017, her stage name Naddel was a registered trademark. In 2008, Abd el Farrag also worked as a DJ. In 2009, she advertised for the German erotic company Orion and for the erotic fair Venus Berlin. In 2013, she participated in Promiboxen on Sat.1. In 2016 and 2018, she took part in the RTL show Raus aus den Schulden, presented by debt counselor Peter Zwegat. Also in 2018, she released her second autobiography Achterbahn.

Bibliography 

 Naddel kocht verführerisch gut, Südwest, Munich 2001, 
 Ungelogen – (k)eine Liebesgeschichte, Herbig, Munich 2003, 
 Nadja Abd el Farrag, Sybille F. Martin: Achterbahn. Eine Biographie, Obermayer, Buchloe 2018,

References

External links

Nadja Abd el Farrag's official website 

1965 births
Living people
Musicians from Hamburg
German people of Sudanese descent
German television personalities
German women pop singers
German autobiographers
Women autobiographers
Ich bin ein Star – Holt mich hier raus! participants